The Egyptian Museum in Cairo, commonly known as the Egyptian Museum, located in Cairo, Egypt, houses the largest collection of Egyptian antiquities in the world. It houses over 120,000 items, with a representative amount on display. Located in a building built in 1901, it is currently the largest museum in Africa. Among its masterpieces are Pharaoh Tutankhamun's treasure, including its iconic gold burial mask, widely considered one of the best-known works of art in the world and a prominent symbol of ancient Egypt.

History

The Egyptian Museum of Antiquities contains many important pieces of ancient Egyptian history. It houses the world's largest collection of Pharaonic antiquities. The Egyptian government established the museum built in 1835 near the Ezbekieh Garden and later moved to the Cairo Citadel. In 1855, Archduke Maximilian of Austria was given all of the artifacts by the Egyptian government; these are now in the Kunsthistorisches Museum, Vienna.

A new museum was established at Boulaq in 1858 in a former warehouse, following the foundation of the new Antiquities Department under the direction of Auguste Mariette. The building lay on the bank of the Nile River, and in 1878 it suffered significant damage owing to the flooding of the Nile River. In 1891, the collections were moved to a former royal palace, in the Giza district of Cairo. They remained there until 1902 when they were moved again to the current museum in Tahrir Square, built by the Italian company of Giuseppe Garozzo and Francesco Zaffrani to a design by the French architect Marcel Dourgnon.

In 2004, the museum appointed Wafaa El Saddik as the first female director general.

During the Egyptian Revolution of 2011, the museum was broken into, and two mummies were destroyed. Several artifacts were also shown to have been damaged and around 50 objects were stolen. Since then, 25 objects have been found. Those that were restored were put on display in September 2013 in an exhibition entitled "Damaged and Restored". Among the displayed artifacts were two statues of King Tutankhamun made of cedar wood and covered with gold, a statue of King Akhenaten, ushabti statues that belonged to the Nubian kings, a mummy of a child, and a small polychrome glass vase.

The museum was reportedly used as a torture site during the 2011 Revolution, with protestors forcibly and unlawfully detained and allegedly abused, according to reports, videos and eyewitness accounts. Activists state that “men were being tortured with electric shocks, whips and wires,” and “women were tied to fences and trees.” Prominent singer and activist Ramy Essam was among those detained and tortured at the museum.

Sale Room for Antiquities 
The Department of Antiquities (Service d'Antiquités Egyptien) operated a sale room (Salle de ventes) in the Egyptian Museum in Cairo from 1902 in room 56 on the ground floor, where original ancient Egyptian artworks and other original artefacts were sold. In addition, until the 1970s, dealers or collectors could bring antiquities to the Cairo Museum for inspection on Thursdays, and if museum officials had no objections, they could pack them in ready-made boxes, have them sealed and cleared for export. Many objects now held in private collections or public museums originated here. After years of debate about the strategy for selling the antiquities, the sale room was finally closed in November 1979.

Interior design

There are two main floors in the museum, the ground floor and the first floor. On the ground floor there is an extensive collection of large-scale works in stone including statues, reliefs and architectural elements. These are arranged chronologically in clockwise fashion, from the pre-dynastic to the Greco-Roman period. The first floor is dedicated to smaller works, including papyri, coins, textiles, and an enormous collection of wooden sarcophagi. The numerous pieces of papyrus are generally small fragments, owing to their decay over the past two millennia. Several languages are found on these pieces, including Greek, Latin, Arabic, and ancient Egyptian. The coins found on this floor are made of many different metals, including gold, silver, and bronze. The coins are not only Egyptian, but also Greek, Roman, and Islamic. This has helped historians research the history of Ancient Egyptian trade.

Also on the ground floor are artifacts from the New Kingdom, the time period between 1550 and 1069 BC. These artifacts are generally larger than items created in earlier centuries. Those items include statues, tables, and coffins (sarcophagi). It contains 42 rooms; upon entering through the security check in the building, one looks toward the atrium and the rear of the building with many items on view from sarcophagi and boats to enormous statues.

On the first floor there are artifacts from the final two dynasties of Egypt, including items from the tombs of the Pharaohs Thutmosis III, Thutmosis IV, Amenophis II, Hatshepsut, and the courtier Maiherpri, as well as many artifacts from the Valley of the Kings, in particular the material from the intact tombs of Tutankhamun and Psusennes I. 

Until 2021, two special rooms contained a number of mummies of kings and other royal family members of the New Kingdom. On April 3, 2021, twenty-two of these mummies were transferred to the National Museum of Egyptian Civilization in Fustat in a grand parade dubbed The Pharaohs' Golden Parade.

Memorial to famous Egyptologists 

In the garden adjacent to the building of the museum, a memorial to famous egyptologists of the world is located. It features a monument to Auguste Mariette, surrounded by 24 busts of the following egyptologists: François Chabas, Johannes Dümichen, Conradus Leemans, Charles Wycliffe Goodwin, Emmanuel de Rougé, Samuel Birch, Edward Hincks, Luigi Vassalli, Émile Brugsch, Karl Richard Lepsius, Théodule Devéria, Vladimir Golenishchev, Ippolito Rosellini, Labib Habachi, Sami Gabra, Selim Hassan, Ahmed Kamal, Zakaria Goneim, Jean-François Champollion, Amedeo Peyron, Willem Pleyte, Gaston Maspero, Peter le Page Renouf and Kazimierz Michałowski.

Gallery

See also
 Egyptian Museum of Turin
 Egyptian Museum of Berlin
 National Museum of Egyptian Civilization
 Grand Egyptian Museum
 List of museums with major collections of Egyptian antiquities

References

Sources

Further reading
 Brier, Bob (1999). The Murder of Tutankhamen: A True Story.  .
 Montet, Pierre (1968). Lives of the Pharaohs. World Publishing Company.
 Wafaa El-Saddik. The Egyptian Museum. Museum International. (Vol. 57, No.1–2, 2005).
Also published, with variant titles, in Italy and the UK. Reviews US ed.

External links

 Egyptian Museum official website
 Egyptian Museum Unofficial
 Gallery of Items in the Egyptian Museum

 
1835 establishments in Egypt
Archaeological museums in Egypt
Cultural infrastructure completed in 1902
Downtown Cairo
Egyptological collections in Egypt
Museums established in 1835
Museums in Cairo
National museums
Neoclassical architecture in Egypt
Tourist attractions in Egypt